Durdle primarily refers to Durdle Door, a natural limestone arch in Dorset, England.

Durdle may also refer to:

 Durdle Pier, disused 17th-century stone shipping quay in Dorset, England
 Darren Durdle (born 1963), Canadian ice hockey defencemen
 Doug Durdle, birth name of Doug Williams (wrestler) (born 1972), English professional wrestler

See also
 Durdles